The Arrowhead Conference is a conference within the National Junior College Athletic Association (NJCAA) located in region 4. The conference consists of six
junior colleges located in northern Illinois.

Member schools

Current members
The Arrowhead (or AAC) currently has six full members, all are public schools:

Notes

See also
National Junior College Athletic Association (NJCAA)
North Central Community College Conference, also in Region 4
Illinois Skyway Conference, also in Region 4

References

External links
NJCAA Region 4 website
NJCAA website

NJCAA conferences
College sports in Illinois